Breakdown is the third live release of bluegrass music by Old & In the Way.

Like the first and second albums (Old & In the Way and That High Lonesome Sound), Breakdown was recorded at the Boarding House in San Francisco in October 1973.

Track listing 
 "Introduction by Peter Rowan" – 1:35
 "Home Is Where the Heart Is" (Connie Gateley, Joe Talley) – 1:59
 "Down Where the River Bends" (Jack Anglin, George Peck, Johnnie Wright) – 4:35
 "On and On" (Bill Monroe) – 3:25
 "The Hobo Song" (Jack Bonus) – 4:58
 "Old & In the Way Breakdown" (Jerry Garcia) – 3:47
 "Till the End of the World Rolls 'Round" (Thomas Newton) – 2:15
 "Panama Red" (Peter Rowan) – 2:41
 "You'll Find Her Name Written There" (Harold Hensley) – 3:25
 "Kissimmee Kid" (Vassar Clements) – 3:10
 "Goin' to the Races" (Carter Stanley) – 2:35
 "Midnight Moonlight" (Rowan) – 5:16
 "Working on a Building" (traditional) – 2:35
 "Muleskinner Blues" (Jimmie Rodgers, George Vaughn) – 2:57
 "Pig in a Pen" (trad.) – 2:50
 "Drifting Too Far from the Shore" (Charles Moody) – 4:50
 "Jerry's Breakdown" (Garcia) – 4:29
 "Wild Horses" (Mick Jagger, Keith Richards) – 4:39
 "Blue Mule" (Rowan) – 4:26
Hidden track:
 "Catfish John" (Bob McDill, Allen Reynolds) – 2:16

Credits

Old & In the Way 
 Vassar Clements – fiddle
 Jerry Garcia – banjo, vocals
 David Grisman – mandolin, vocals
 John Kahn – acoustic bass
 Peter Rowan – guitar, vocals

Production 
 Producer – David Grisman
 Executive producer – Craig Miller
 Recording engineers – Owsley Stanley, Vickie Babcock
 Liner notes – Neil V. Rosenberg
 Principal photography – Roberto Rabanne
 Additional photography – Nobuharu Komoriya, Robert Minkin, Greg Mudd, Gary Nichols
 Design & layout – D. Brent Hauseman
 Mastering – Paul Stubblebine

References 

Old & In the Way live albums
1997 live albums
Acoustic Disc live albums